The 1998 World Fencing Championships were held in La Chaux-de-Fonds, Switzerland.

Medal summary

Men's events

Women's events

Medal table

References
FIE Results

World Fencing Championships
F
1998 in Swiss sport
La Chaux-de-Fonds
1998 in fencing
October 1998 sports events in Europe